Comprehensive National Power (CNP) (pinyin: zōnghé guólì) is a measure of the general power of a nation-state. It is a putative measure, important in the contemporary political thought of the People's Republic of China from the 1980s onwards and first introduced into official documents in 1992.

CNP can be calculated numerically by combining various quantitative indices to create a single number held to measure the power of a nation-state. These indices take into account military, political, economic and cultural factors.

About 
Inspired by F. Clifford German, J. David Singer, Stuart Bremer and John Stuckey, A.F.K. Organski and Jacek Kugler, and Ray Cline's understanding and formulas for national power assessment. It builds upon concepts such as superpower and regional power, as well as soft power, hard power and smart power.

A 1995 definition of CNP refers to it as "the totality of a country's economic, military and political power in a given period. It signals the country's comprehensive development level and its position in the international system."

There are a number of methods for calculating CNP devised by the Chinese Academy of Social Sciences, Chinese Military Academy, Chinese Institute of Contemporary International Relations and independent Chinese scholars.

National Strategic Resources 
Michael Porter lists five major resources, that is, physical, human, infrastructure, knowledge and capital resources. Accordingly, the national strategic resources are divided into eight categories, with 23 indictors. Those categories constitute CNP:

 Economic resources
 Natural resources
 Capital resources
 Knowledge and Technology resources
 Government resources
 Military resources
 International resources
 Cultural resources

Adaptations 
A fairly simplistic and effective index was developed by Chin-Lung Chang.  It uses critical mass, economic capacity and military capacity. Due to its indicators, it is often repeatable and easy to define, making it comparable to the Human Development Index in understanding and reliability.

See also 
 Composite Index of National Capability
 Power in international relations

References 
Citations

Works cited

Further reading 
 Michael Pillsbury (January 2000). China Debates the Future Security Environment. National Defense University Press.

Hu Angang, Men Honghua (2002).The Rising of Modern China: Comprehensive National Power and Grand Strategy. Strategy & Management
Kaushik Basu, Supriyo De, Rangeet Ghosh (2011). The evolving dynamics of global economic power in the postcrisis world: Revelations from a new Index of Government Economic Power. Department of Economic Affairs, Ministry of Finance, Government of India.
Ł. Kiczma, M. Sułek (2020). National Power Rankings of Countries 2020. Oficyna Wydawnicza ASPRA-JR, Warszawa 2020. ISBN 978-83-8209-033-8

External links 
 Powermetrics Information Network
Thinking about Power

International relations theory
International security
Foreign relations of China
Chinese words and phrases